Vangara is a village in Bheemadevarpalle mandal in Hanamkonda district of Telangana, India.

Vangara is well connected with Warangal, Hyderabad and Karimnagar. Nearest Railway Station is Uppal (23 km away). Nearest Airport is Rajiv Gandhi International Airport (185 km away). It got AP Girls Residency School during P.V. Narasimha Rao's rule.

It is famous as the hometown of P. V. Narasimha Rao, a former Prime Minister of India.

Demographics
 census, Vangara had a population of 6,081. The total population constitute, 2,973 males and 3,108 females —a sex ratio of 1045 females per 1000 males. 538 children are in the age group of 0–6 years. The average literacy rate stands at 55.84% with 3,396 literates.

Government and politics 
Vangara falls under the assembly constituency is Husnabad, which is represented by MLA Vodithela Sathish Kumar since 2018.

Prominent people
 P. V. Narasimha Rao, former Prime Minister of India
P. V. Rajeshwar Rao, former Member of parliament
Surabhi Vani Devi, Member of Legislative Council

References

Villages in Hanamkonda district